Linnaemyini is a tribe of flies in the family Tachinidae.

Genera
Chrysosomopsis Townsend, 1916
Linnaemya Robineau-Desvoidy, 1830
Lydina Robineau-Desvoidy, 1830
Lypha Robineau-Desvoidy, 1830

References

Brachyceran flies of Europe
Brachycera tribes
Commemoration of Carl Linnaeus
Tachininae